Daniel Stephen Zeichner (born 9 November 1956) is a British politician who has served as the Member of Parliament (MP) for Cambridge since 2015. A member of the Labour Party, he defeated Liberal Democrat Julian Huppert before retaining his seat in the 2017 and 2019 general elections. Prior to his parliamentary career, Zeichner was a councillor for eight years.

Early life
Daniel Zeichner was born in Beckenham in 1956.  His father was an Austrian political refugee whose family fled Vienna in 1938: His mother was the descendant of agricultural workers from Cambridgeshire.  As a teenager, Zeichner was a middle-distance runner. He attended Trinity School of John Whitgift, a former grammar school, turned private school.

In 1976, Zeichner enrolled at the University of Cambridge to read history at King's College. He joined the Labour Party in 1979.

Zeichner's first job after graduation was as a trainee computer programmer, working for Cambridgeshire County Council at the register office next to Shire Hall on Castle Hill, Cambridge.  He later worked in IT for a number of companies, including Norwich Union in Norfolk, Philips in East Chesterton and Perkins Engines in Peterborough.

In 1992 Zeichner was hired by Norwich South MP John Garrett, working as press officer and parliamentary assistant for Garrett between 1992 and 1997.   He subsequently worked for Garrett's successor, Charles Clarke, until 1999. In 2002 Zeichner began working for the public sector trade union UNISON as a political officer, a post he held until he was elected as MP for Cambridge in 2015.

Political career
Zeichner has served several terms on Labour's National Policy Forum, the Labour Party's top policy-making body. He was first elected to represent the East of England on the body shortly after it was first established by Tony Blair as part of the "Partnership in Power" process.

He was elected as a councillor in Burston, Norfolk, in 1995, a position in which he served until 2003. During this time Zeichner became leader of the Labour group on South Norfolk District Council.

Zeichner stood unsuccessfully for Parliament four times. He contested Mid Norfolk in 1997, losing by fewer than 1,400 votes.  He stood again in 2001 and 2005, being defeated by larger margins. In 2006 he was selected as the official Labour candidate for the Cambridge constituency, which had been lost to the Liberal Democrats at the previous year's election. At the 2010 general election, Zeichner finished in third place, polling 24% of the vote.

He contested the Cambridge seat five years later, and increased his vote by more than 11 percentage points, defeating the sitting Lib Dem MP Julian Huppert by 599 votes. Zeichner was appointed as a Shadow Transport Minister (with responsibility for buses, bikes and walking) on 18 September 2015. At the snap 2017 general election Zeichner retained his seat with a greatly increased majority, again over Julian Huppert, of 12,661 votes.

He contested again in Cambridge in the 2019 general election, and retained his seat, with a majority of 9,639 over runner-up Lib-Dem candidate Rod Cantrill.

In January 2020, Zeichner was appointed as a Shadow Farming and Agriculture Minister in the Shadow Department for Environment, Food and Rural Affairs (DEFRA) team. He took on the renamed brief from former Stroud MP David Drew, previously Shadow Farming and Rural Affairs Minister, who lost his seat in the 2019 General Election.

Zeichner remained in the Shadow DEFRA team following Keir Starmer's first reshuffle as Labour leader, but gained the fisheries brief from Ruth Jones MP, as Shadow Food, Farming and Fisheries Minister.

In June 2020, Parliament's :Standards and Privileges Committee censured Zeichner for misusing public funds relating to stationery and pre-paid House of Commons envelopes during the 2019 general election campaign.

On 30 August 2021, Keir Starmer announced that Zeichner would become acting Shadow Secretary of State for Environment, Food and Rural Affairs in place of Luke Pollard until the 2021 Labour Party Conference to allow Pollard to spend more time with his community after the Plymouth shooting.

Political positions
Zeichner describes his politics as "socialist in a modern context". He supported Tony Benn in the 1981 deputy leadership election. In the 2010 Labour leadership election Zeichner supported Ed Miliband. In the 2015 Labour leadership election he supported Yvette Cooper. Zeichner supported Owen Smith in the September 2016 Labour Party leadership election, and in the 2020 leadership election he supported Keir Starmer. Zeichner opposes renewal of Trident.

In June 2017 Zeichner resigned as a Shadow Transport Minister in order to vote in favour of an amendment to the government's 2017 Queen's Speech supporting the UK's membership of the single market, in defiance of the party whip. The amendment, which was defeated by 322 votes to 101, was tabled by former Shadow Cabinet Minister Chuka Umunna. In justifying his decision Zeichner explained:My position on Europe has always been clear. I am a passionate pro-European and a straightforward politician. ... I promised the people of Cambridge I would stick to my principles and I would do right by our city – that means voting with my conscience and doing all I can to oppose the Tories' extreme Brexit which would, in my opinion, damage our economy, our security and our society as a whole.

Zeichner is an Executive Member of SERA – Labour's Environment Campaign and the Chair of the All-Party Parliamentary Group for Future Generations. He is a proponent of proportional representation and a supporter of the Labour Campaign for Electoral Reform.

Zeicher has asserted on multiple occasions he was absent during a vote in 2016 on whether to carry out investigations on the Iraq War. However, on the official log of voting, it shows he voted against the motion. He remains a supporter of Tony Blair, claiming he contributed positively to Britain, and rejects that he is a war criminal.

Personal life
Zeichner met Barbara "Budge" Ziolkowska, his life partner, when he was a student at King's College, Cambridge, in 1976.  They lived in Comberton, a village six miles (ten kilometres) southwest of the city of Cambridge.

Notes

References

External links

1956 births
Living people
Alumni of King's College, Cambridge
Councillors in Norfolk
British people of Austrian descent
English people of Austrian descent
Labour Party (UK) councillors
Labour Party (UK) MPs for English constituencies
UK MPs 2015–2017
UK MPs 2017–2019
People from Beckenham
People from Comberton
People from South Norfolk (district)
UK MPs 2019–present
Aviva people